The Western Labor Conference was a Canadian labour convention held March 13, 1919, in Calgary. It is known for being the convention in which the One Big Union was formally proposed.

Two hundred and thirty-nine delegates from five Canadian provinces attended the event. Alberta sent the largest number of delegates at 89, British Columbia sent the second at 85, Manitoba sent 46, Saskatchewan sent 17, and Ontario sent 2. The British Columbia Federation of Labour had met already three days prior to the event and had prepared several resolutions to propose. The British Columbia Federation of Labour was viewed as having the most radical beliefs of any of the attending groups of delegates. The resolutions proposed by the British Columbia Federation of Labour were for a working schedule with a six-hour work day, the end of allied interference in Russia, the severing off connections with international unions outside of Canada, the end of the political imprisonment of Canadian citizens, and the acknowledgement of the current impediment of labour movements under the capitalist economic system. If these demands were not met by the Canadian government by June 1, 1919, the newly formed One Big Union would call for a general strike. The resolutions were concluded with a greeting of solidarity towards the Russian Bolsheviks and the German Spartacus League. These resolution were met with opposition among the other delegates of the conference. More moderate delegates of the conference proposed the idea of polling all registered Canadian trade unionists on the decision of the creation of the One Big Union as well as the formal leaving of Trades and Labour Congress of Canada and American Federation of Labor. This motion was decided against. In its place it was agreed that a committee would be formed to familiarize Canadian workers with the concept of One Big Union. This committee consisted of R. J. Johns, W. A. Pritchard, J. Knight, J. Naylor, and V. R. Midley.

References

Footnotes

Bibliography

 
 

Canadian Labour Congress